European traffic signs present relevant differences between countries despite an apparent uniformity and standardisation. Most European countries refer to the 1968 Vienna Convention on Road Signs and Signals. The convention has been adopted by the following countries (including acceding states): Albania, Armenia, Austria, Belarus, Belgium, Bosnia and Herzegovina, Bulgaria, Croatia, Cyprus, the Czech Republic, Denmark, Estonia, Finland, France, Georgia, Germany, Greece, Hungary, Italy, Latvia, Liechtenstein, Lithuania, Luxembourg, Moldova, Montenegro, Netherlands, North Macedonia, Norway, Poland, Portugal, Romania, Russia, San Marino, Serbia, Slovakia, Slovenia, Spain, Sweden, Switzerland, Turkey, Ukraine and the United Kingdom. The convention has not been adopted by Ireland, Iceland or Malta.

Differences between European traffic signs 

The main differences relate to
 Graphic design details
 Local regulatory significance
 The colour-coding of directional signs
 Local language texts (sometimes bilingual)
 The meaning and colour-coding of horizontal road surface markings

Graphic differences 
 Warning signs in Ireland are yellow and diamond-shaped (as in the Americas, Australasia, and some east Asian countries), and thus differ from the white or yellow, red-bordered, triangular signs found in the rest of Europe
 The design of individual pictograms (tunnel, pedestrian, car, etc.), while broadly similar, often varies in detail from country to country
 Type of arrows may be different
 Fonts of written words

Differences of directional and informatory signage

Differences in meanings 
 Sometimes similar signs have minor differences in meanings, following the local traffic codes.
 All European countries use the metric system (distances in kilometres or metres; speeds in kilometres per hour; heights, widths and lengths in metres; weights in tonnes) with the exception of the United Kingdom, where distances and speeds are still indicated in imperial measurements (miles or yards and miles per hour). Since 2016, on width and height limit signs both metric and imperial measurements are used (metres and feet & inches), however older signs still show imperial-only measurements . Weight limits have been expressed in metric tonnes since 1981, but signs continued to use an upper case "T" until 2011.

Road surface markings 
 Longitudinal lines (lanes and margins) and symbols on the carriageway are always white (but in Norway a yellow line separates two-way traffic and in Ireland edge lines are yellow). Temporary markings are yellow in Germany, France, Italy, the Netherlands and Spain, but red/orange in Liechtenstein, Switzerland and Russia, and white in the United Kingdom.
 A stop line is always represented by a white thick traversal continuous line, but a give way line may be represented by a white thick dashed line as rectangles (Germany, France, Spain) or by a double-dashed line (United Kingdom) or by the combination of a single solid line and a single dashed line (Ireland) or by a white line of triangles (Austria, Italy, Liechtenstein, the Netherlands, Norway, and Switzerland)
 A disc (time-limited) parking place is identified by white lines in Germany and by blue lines in Liechtenstein, the Netherlands, France, Spain, and Switzerland. A chargeable parking place is identified by white lines in Germany, France, Liechtenstein, the Netherlands, and Switzerland and by blue lines in Italy and Spain. A parking place reserved for disabled people is bordered in white in Germany, the Netherlands, Spain and the United Kingdom; in yellow in Italy, Liechtenstein and Switzerland; and in blue in France. Other reserved parking places (bus, taxis) are bordered with yellow lines in Italy, Liechtenstein, Spain, Switzerland, and the United Kingdom, but with white lines in Germany.
 The prohibition of roadside parking can be indicated by a yellow continuous line (Spain, the Republic of Ireland, and the United Kingdom), by a yellow dashed line (Austria, the Netherlands and France), by a yellow dashed line with X's (Liechtenstein and Switzerland), a white continuous line (Italy), or else by black-and-white (the Netherlands) or a black-and-yellow (the Netherlands and Italy) kerb markings. Only in the United Kingdom and the Republic of Ireland does a double yellow line (as well as a white zig-zag line in the vicinity of pedestrian crossings) mean "no parking at any time".
 The prohibition of stopping / waiting can be indicated by a yellow continuous line (Austria, the Netherlands, France, Liechtenstein and Switzerland), and in (certain cities of) the United Kingdom by a red continuous line (with double red lines extending the meaning to "no stopping at any time). In the United Kingdom, a yellow zig-zag line near hospitals, police stations, and schools means "no stopping".

Different typefaces in texts 

Albania, Italy and San Marino use the  typeface (with the narrow variant ), a heavier version of the British Transport typeface.
Albania has recently started using Arial Narrow Bold typeface.
Andorra officially uses the Swiss 721 (Bold Condensed) typeface, which is identical to Helvetica. However, some signs use the Caractères and Carretera Convencional / Traffic Type Spain D typefaces.
Austria and Slovakia use the TERN typeface. In the past, Austria used the Austria  and  typefaces until 2010. Slovakia used the Universal Grotesk typeface until 2014.
Azerbaijan, Belarus, Cyprus, North Macedonia, Malta, Moldova, Russia, Slovenia, Turkey and Ukraine use the Arial Bold typefaces in mixture with other typefaces.
Armenia, Azerbaijan, Belarus, Georgia, Lithuania, Moldova, Russia and Ukraine use typefaces based on one specified in a Soviet standard .
Ukraine has recently started using the Road UA typeface, as part of a signage redesign.
Belgium, Bosnia and Herzegovina, Bulgaria, Croatia, Luxembourg, Montenegro, North Macedonia, Romania, Slovenia, and Serbia use the SNV typeface. Liechtenstein and Switzerland used this typeface until 2003.
Cyprus, Greece, Iceland, Ireland, Malta, Portugal, and the United Kingdom use the Transport typeface. An oblique variant of Transport is used in Ireland for Irish text.
Motorway typeface is used for route numbers on United Kingdom and Ireland motorways, and for exit and route numbers in Portugal.
Denmark uses the  typeface. The typeface is derived from the British Transport typeface.
Estonia uses the Arial Narrow Bold typeface.
Finland uses a typeface developed in the 1960s by the former national board of roads and waterways.
France uses the  typeface.
Germany, Czech Republic and Latvia use the DIN 1451 typeface.
Greece uses a modified version of the British Transport typeface on most regular roads; motorway signs use a modified version of DIN 1451.
Hungary does not use a defined typeface as the letters are defined one-by-one in the national regulation. The typeface resembles the DIN 1451 typeface closely.
Luxembourg uses Helvetica (Bold), Caractères L4 (italic), DIN 1451, and the SNV typefaces, often inconsistently.
The Netherlands uses typefaces derived from FHWA typeface: ANWB/RWS Cc (narrow), Dd (medium) and Ee (wide).
Norway uses the  typeface.
Poland does not use a defined typeface as the letters are defined one-by-one in the national regulation. There are three typefaces resembling the defined one, with two of them distributed as non-commercial freeware –  and  typefaces. The third one, fully compliant with the regulation is available only for road signs making companies.
The typeface  is derived from the British Transport typeface, and is almost identical to the Italian . Since 2014, all new signs use  regardless of the status of the road.
Sweden uses the Tratex typeface.
Switzerland and Liechtenstein use the ASTRA-Frutiger typeface since 2003.
Turkey uses two typefaces derived from the FHWA typeface. O-Serisi is used for motorways and E-Serisi is used for all other roads.

In Albania, Andorra, Belarus, the Czech Republic, Estonia, Finland, France, Italy, Latvia, Lithuania, Moldova, Monaco, Russia, San Marino, Sweden, and Ukraine, destinations on direction signs are written in capital letters. In Ireland, they are written in all-capital letters in English and in mixed-case letters in Irish. In Austria, Germany, Liechtenstein. Luxembourg, Netherlands, Norway, Poland, Romania, Slovakia and Switzerland both capital and lowercase are used. In Spain, destinations reached by motorway are written in capital and lowercase, while those reached by other roads are written in capital letters. In the United Kingdom and Portugal, regional destinations names and cardinal directions are written in capital letters, while the remaining destinations names are written in capital and lowercase.

Table of traffic signs comparison

Priority

Warning

Prohibitory

Mandatory

Special regulations

Indication

De-restriction

Built-up area limits 
Under the Vienna Convention the begin and end built-up area signs imply a change between built-up area and rural traffic rules including speed limit. In many European countries the dark background with light coloured text version of the sign is intended for information only. Poland uses white text on a green background (E-17a/E18a) to show the political boundary of a place as information and uses the black on white pictogram version (D-42/D-43) to designate the change of traffic rules.

See also 
 Comparison of European traffic laws
 Traffic sign
 Vienna Convention on Road Signs and Signals
 Road signs in Armenia
 Road signs in Austria
 Road signs in Azerbaijan
 Road signs in Belgium
 Road signs in Bosnia and Herzegovina
 Road signs in the Czech Republic
 Road signs in Denmark
 Road signs in Estonia
 Road signs in Finland
 Road signs in France
 Road signs in Georgia
 Road signs in Germany
 Road signs in Greece
 Road signs in Iceland
 Road signs in Ireland
 Road signs in Italy
 Road signs in Lithuania
 Road signs in Malta
 Road signs in the Netherlands
 Road signs in Norway
 Road signs in Poland
 Road signs in Portugal
 Road signs in Russia
 Road signs in Serbia
 Road signs in Sweden
 Road signs in Switzerland and Liechtenstein
 Road signs in Turkey
 Road signs in Ukraine
 Road signs in the United Kingdom

Notes

Sources 
 European Standard for Traffic Signs - EN 12899-1:2001 Fixed, Vertical Road Traffic Signs – Part 1: Fixed Signs, Requirements

References 

Signs
Traffic signs
European road signs